A380 may refer to:

 Airbus A380 the world's largest passenger airliner.
 A380 road, a main road in South West England
 Arc A380, a graphics card from Intel
 RFA Cedardale (A380), a British fleet auxiliary vessel